From 1922 until 1962, the United States Navy, the United States Marine Corps and the United States Coast Guard used a system to designate their aircraft that included information about a craft's role and its manufacturer. For a listing of all such designations, see the list of United States Navy aircraft designations (pre-1962).

Background

The U.S. Navy used two sequential designation systems prior to 1922, neither of which directly conveyed information about the aircraft's mission. The first system, adopted in 1911, consisted of a single letter signifying the manufacturer and aircraft class followed by sequential numbers for individual aircraft. 

In March 1914, the navy introduced a new system similar to hull classification symbols for warships, with an alphabetical code for the aircraft class followed by sequential numbers for individual aircraft, with the designation of the first aircraft of a particular design being used as the type designation for similar aircraft; for instance, aircraft similar to AH-8 were referred to as AH-8 type. The second system was abandoned in May 1917 without replacement; the navy began using the manufacturers' model designations.

The 1922 system
On 29 March 1922, a new designation system was introduced with a reorganization of U.S. naval aviation under the Bureau of Aeronautics. The system conveyed its information in the form:
(Mission)(Design Number)(Manufacturer)-(Subtype)(Minor Modification)

For example, F4U-1A referred to a minor modification (A) to the first major subtype (1) of Chance-Vought's (U) fourth (4) fighter (F) design.

For the first few years after the system was introduced, the manufacturer's letter and the mission letter were sometimes reversed. If it was the manufacturer's first design for that particular mission, there was no number before the manufacturer letter.

Mission
The mission of the aircraft was designated by a one or two letter code.  This code would also indicate whether the craft was a glider (L), helicopter (H) or lighter-than-air (Z). Duplicated codes were not in use at the same time.

Design number
In cases where an aircraft was its manufacturer's first design for a particular mission, the 1 would not be written.  Thus the Consolidated Catalina patrol aircraft was the PBY, not PB1Y, and the McDonnell Phantom was FH, not F1H.

Manufacturer
The codes used to denote manufacturers were not unique to a single company as they were reassigned, usually when the company had either ceased operations or had not produced an aircraft for the Navy for a considerable period of time. Additionally, aircraft built under license received a separate design number than the aircraft produced by the designing company.  For example, Goodyear produced the Vought F4U Corsair as the FG and the Grumman TBF Avenger torpedo bomber was produced by General Motors as the TBM. Foreign aircraft generally did not receive a designation under this system unless they were to be built under license in the United States, or were built for use in the United States, such as aircraft built in Canada, including the Fairchild-Canada SBF Helldiver and Canadian-Vickers PBV Catalina.

Minor modifications
Letters were occasionally appended after the design number to denote minor modifications to the subtype; e.g. adding 'N' to the Grumman F6F-5 Hellcat designated the radar-equipped night fighter version of that model: F6F-5N. 

The first suffix to be used was "C" for aircraft modified for launching from an aircraft catapult on a battleship. Before World War II, the suffixes were often consecutive, with many lacking defined meanings, and they were not often used. During the war, they came into wide use and were given defined meanings, but letters were duplicated and their meanings were inconsistent. For instance, the letter "A" was used both for deletion of the tailhook from an aircraft normally so equipped (e.g. the Douglas SBD-5A, used from land bases) and for addition of this equipment to a land-based aircraft; for amphibious versions of flying boats (e.g. the Consolidated PBY-5A); for armament added to a normally unarmed type; and for miscellaneous modifications (e.g. the aforementioned F4U-1A). The addition of a tailhook to a land-based aircraft could also be designated with a "C", e.g. the North American SNJ-5C, repeating the letter previously used for catapult-launched aircraft.

A significant wartime exception to this system was existing United States Army Air Forces (USAAF) types adopted by the Navy, such as the North American B-25 Mitchell; in some such cases, the minor modification letter simply mirrored the USAAF sub-type letter, e.g. the B-25H became the PBJ-1H.

End of the system
In 1962, the Department of Defense unified its aircraft designation systems along the lines of the Air Force's system.  Many Navy aircraft then in service were redesignated.  For many planes, the mission letters and design numbers were retained, as the Douglas AD Skyraider became the A-1 and the McDonnell F4H Phantom II became the F-4.  Some aircraft design numbers were not retained, like the North American Vigilante, which was redesignated from A3J to A-5 (the A-3 designation having already been assigned to the A-3 Skywarrior).

Similar systems
A very similar system, the short system, was adopted by the Imperial Japanese Navy Air Service in the late 1920s that differed only in the use of the 1 for the first assigned type, having letters assigned to match Japanese aircraft and manufacturers, and not having a different number series for each manufacturer.

System examples

See also
 United States Department of Defense aerospace vehicle designation
 United States military aircraft designation systems
 British military aircraft designation systems
 Hull classification symbol
 Italian Armed Forces aircraft designation system
 List of military aircraft of the United States
 List of United States Navy aircraft designations (pre-1962)
 RLM aircraft designation system
 Soviet Union military aircraft designation systems
 Japanese military aircraft designation systems
 1962 United States Tri-Service aircraft designation system 
 1962 United States Tri-Service missile and drone designation system

References

Citations

Bibliography

External links
Designation-Systems.net: Aircraft Redesignations in 1962
hazegray.org: Designation Systems

United States military aircraft
United States Navy